The men's pole vault event at the 2007 European Athletics U23 Championships was held in Debrecen, Hungary, at Gyulai István Atlétikai Stadion on 13 and 15 July.

Medalists

Results

Final
15 July

Qualifications
13 July
Qualifying 5.45 or 12 best to the Final

Group A

Group B

Participation
According to an unofficial count, 17 athletes from 10 countries participated in the event.

 (1)
 (2)
 (3)
 (1)
 (1)
 (3)
 (1)
 (1)
 (1)
 (3)

References

Pole vault
Pole vault at the European Athletics U23 Championships